The Party for Renewal and Redemption is a political party in Togo. 
At the last presidential of 24 April 2005, its candidate Nicolas Lawson won 1.04% of the vote.

The party participated in the October 2007 parliamentary election, but did not win any seats in the National Assembly.

References 

Political parties in Togo